Buzău County is a county (județ) of Romania, in the historical region Muntenia, with the capital city at Buzău.

Demographics 

In 2011, it had a population of 432,054 and the population density was 70.7/km2.

 Romanians – 97%
 Romani – under 3% declared and others

Geography 
This county has a total area of 6,103 km2.

In the North Side there are the mountains from the southern end of the Eastern Carpathians group – the Vrancea Mountains and the Buzău Mountains with heights over 1,700 m.  The heights decrease in the South and East passing through the subcarpathian hills to the Bărăgan Plain at about 80 m.

The main river crossing the county is the Buzău River which collects many small rivers from the mountains and flows to the East into the Siret River.

Neighbours 

 Brăila County to the east.
 Prahova County and Brașov County to the west.
 Covasna County and Vrancea County to the north.
 Ialomița County to the south.

Economy 
The predominant industries in the county are:
 Mechanical components; railway and automotive components
 Metallurgical parts
 Glass
 Food
 Textiles
 Wood

The hilly area is well-suited for wines and fruit orchards. Salt and oil are the main resources extracted in the county.

Tourism 

The main tourist destinations are:
 The city of Buzău.
 The Vrancea Mountains and Buzău Mountains.
 The Berca Mud Volcanoes
 The amber museum in Colți
 The Ciolanu Monastery and the Măgura sculpture camp
 The Rătești Monastery
 The Amara Resort.
 The Sărata-Monteoru Resort.

Politics
The Buzău County Council, renewed at the 2020 local elections, consists of 32 counsellors, with the following party composition:

Administrative divisions 

Buzău County has 2 municipalities, 3 towns and 82 communes.
Municipalities
Buzău – capital city; population: 108,384 (as of 2011)
Râmnicu Sărat
Towns
Nehoiu
Pătârlagele
Pogoanele

Communes
Amaru
Bălăceanu
Balta Albă
Beceni
Berca
Bisoca
Blăjani
Boldu
Bozioru
Brădeanu
Brăești
Breaza
Buda
C.A. Rosetti
Calvini
Cănești
Cătina
Cernătești
Chiliile
Chiojdu
Cilibia
Cislău
Cochirleanca
Colți
Costești
Cozieni
Florica
Gălbinași
Gherăseni
Ghergheasa
Glodeanu Sărat
Glodeanu-Siliștea
Grebănu
Gura Teghii
Largu
Lopătari
Luciu
Măgura
Mărăcineni
Mărgăritești
Mânzălești
Merei
Mihăilești
Movila Banului
Murgești
Năeni
Odăile
Padina
Pardoși
Pănătău
Pârscov
Pietroasele
Podgoria
Poșta Câlnău
Puiești
Racovițeni
Râmnicelu
Robeasca
Rușețu
Săgeata
Săhăteni
Săpoca
Sărulești
Scorțoasa
Scutelnici
Siriu
Smeeni
Stâlpu
Tisău
Topliceni
Țintești
Ulmeni
Unguriu
Vadu Pașii
Valea Râmnicului
Valea Salciei
Vâlcelele
Vernești
Vintilă Vodă
Viperești
Zărnești
Ziduri

Historical county

Historically, the county was located in the central-southern part of Greater Romania, in the northeastern part of the historical region of Muntenia. Its territory included the southern and western parts of today's Buzău County and several localities that are today in Prahova County, including the town of Mizil. It was bordered on the west by Prahova County, to the north by the counties of Brașov, Trei Scaune, and Putna, to the east by the counties of Râmnicu Sărat and Brăila, and to the south by Ialomița County.

Administration

The county has seen multiple subdivisions administratively.

At the end of the 19th century, the county was subdivided into six districts (plăși):
Plasa Sărata, with the town of Buzău and 16 communes
Plasa Câmpului, with 14 communes
Plasa Tohani, with the town of Mizil and 17 communes
Plasa Buzău, with 17 communes
Plasa Pârscov, with 16 communes
Plasa Slănic, with 19 communes

In the interwar period, the territory of the county was initially divided into four districts:
Plasa Buzău, headquartered at Pătârlagele
Plasa Câmpul, headquartered at Buzău
Plasa Slănic, headquartered at Săpoca
Plasa Tohani, headquartered at Mizil

Subsequently, the territory of the county was reorganized into seven districts, by abolishing Plasa Câmpul and establishing four new districts:
Plasa Buzău, headquartered at Pătârlagele
Plasa Câlnău, headquartered at Buzău
Plasa Câmpeni, headquartered at Pogoanele
Plasa Orașul, headquartered at Buzău
Plasa Pârscov, headquartered at Pârscov
Plasa Slănic, headquartered at Săpoca
Plasa Tohani, headquartered at Mizil

Population 
According to the 1930 census data, the county population was 309,405 inhabitants, ethnically divided as follows: 97.4% Romanians, 1.5% Romanies, 0.5% Jews, as well as other minorities. From the religious point of view, the population was 98.9% Eastern Orthodox, 0.5% Jewish, as well as other minorities.

Urban population 
In 1930, the county's urban population was 42,127 inhabitants, comprising 91.2% Romanians, 3.7% Jews, 2.3% Romanies, 0.9% Hungarians, as well as other minorities. From the religious point of view, the urban population was composed of 93.3% Eastern Orthodox, 3.9% Jewish, 1.0% Roman Catholic, as well as other minorities.

References

External links

 
Counties of Romania
Geography of Wallachia
1879 establishments in Romania
1938 disestablishments in Romania
1940 establishments in Romania
1950 disestablishments in Romania
1968 establishments in Romania
States and territories established in 1879
States and territories disestablished in 1938
States and territories established in 1940
States and territories disestablished in 1950
States and territories established in 1968